The Last Days of Pompeo (Italian: Gli ultimi giorni di Pompeo) is a 1937 Italian "white-telephones" comedy film directed by Mario Mattoli and starring Enrico Viarisio, Roberta Mari and Camillo Pilotto. The film's title is an allusion to the novel The Last Days of Pompeii by Edward Bulwer-Lytton. It refers to a character in contemporary Italy named Pompeo.

The film's was shot at Cinecittà Studios in Rome.

Cast
Enrico Viarisio as  Pompeo Quarantini 
Roberta Mari as  L'eritiere 
Camillo Pilotto as  Il banchiere 
Luigi Cimara as L'avvocato 
Marcello Giorda as  Il commissario 
Armando Migliari as  L'americano 
Franco Coop as L'ufficiale della marina mercantile 
Armando Fineschi as  Manolo D'Add 
Maria Donati   
Tecla Scarano   
Agostino Salvietti   
Vincenzo Scarpetta
Dina Perbellini 
Clelia Bernacchi   
Romano Calò

References

Bibliography
 Aprà, Adriano. The Fabulous Thirties: Italian cinema 1929-1944. Electa International, 1979.

External links 
 

1937 films
Italian black-and-white films
1930s Italian-language films
1937 comedy films
Films directed by Mario Mattoli
Italian comedy films
Films shot at Cinecittà Studios
1930s Italian films